Battushig Batbold (born 23 July 1986) is a Mongolian businessman who has served as a member of the International Olympic Committee (IOC) since 2020.

Education
Batbold received a bachelor of Arts degree in economics from the University of Chicago, and a Master in Business Administration from the Harvard Business School.

Career
Batbold is chairman of his father Sükhbaataryn Batbold's company, Altai Holdings in Mongolia. He is also chair of one of Mongolia's leading telecommunications operators, Skytel Group, as well as Sky Hypermarket LLC (Emart Mongolia).
From 2016 until 2018, Batbold was a member of the Monetary Policy Committee of the Central Bank of Mongolia. He was also the former metals and mining analyst at Morgen Stanely Investment Bank in London.

Sports career
Batbold played basketball throughout high school, where he was captain at the Northwest School in Seattle.

In 2015, Batbold was elected President of the Mongolian Badminton Association, which followed with his election as council member of the Badminton World Federation in 2017. That same year he was elected First Vice President of the Mongolian National Olympic Committee (MNOC).
From 2017 until 2019, he was an executive Committee member of Badminton Asia.
In October 2019, Batbold who was an executive board member at the time, was elected to become acting president of the MNOC when president Zagdsuren stepped down due to health reasons. Batbold held the position until August 2020, when Naidangiin Tüvshinbayar was elected president at the MNOC's Extraordinary General Assembly. 
Batbold was the Chef de Mission for Mongolia during the Tokyo 2020 Olympics.

He has been a member of the IOC Marketing Commission since 2018, and member of the IOC since 2020.

Awards
In 2017, Batbold was listed in Forbes Mongolia as Top 30 Young People, and in 2019, he was listed as Leading Entrepreneur.

References

International Olympic Committee members
Monetary Policy Committee members
Morgan Stanley people
Mongolian men's basketball players
Badminton in Mongolia
1986 births
University of Chicago alumni
Harvard Business School alumni
Living people
Badminton executives and administrators